Australia has participated in the Eurovision Song Contest seven times since its debut in  and has been in the top ten four times.

Australia's participation in the contest has been confirmed by the European Broadcasting Union (EBU) and Special Broadcasting Service (SBS) until 2023.

The contest attracts a significantly high viewership for Australian broadcaster Special Broadcasting Service (SBS) and has a broad, active and loyal national fan base. Due to time differences with European host cities, the contest typically airs at 5.00am local Australian Eastern Standard time (AEST). The contest receives widespread Australian mainstream media coverage each year, however it also enjoys a cult following amongst dedicated Australian fans.

History

1983–2014 

The contest has attracted a strong viewing audience in Australia. Early broadcasts of the contest in Australia either featured no commentary or used the 's commentary as transmitted by the BBC. In , actress and comedian Mary Coustas provided commentary for the contest performing as her comedic character Effie. From , Julia Zemiro and Sam Pang were assigned as commentators for the competition by SBS.  saw SBS replace the commentators with comedian Joel Creasey and TV and radio personality Myf Warhurst. In addition to broadcasting the contest, SBS also broadcast the 50th and 60th anniversary programmes.

From 2010 to 2014, SBS allowed Australian viewers to participate in their own televote for the final. However, these votes were not counted at the actual contest and did not affect the overall result. The SBS commentary team and Australian delegation were awarded a commentary booth of their own at the 2012 contest in Baku. They have been allocated a commentary booth every year since.

Australia's first appearance in the international broadcast of the Eurovision Song Contest occurred on 14 May 2013 during the first semi-final in Malmö, Sweden. A short pre-recorded video titled "Greetings from Australia" (also referred to as "Why Australia Loves Eurovision"), submitted by SBS and hosted by Julia Zemiro, was broadcast during the interval acts. This presentation marked 30 years of broadcasting the Eurovision Song Contest in Australia, and was preceded the week leading up to the contest by a locally broadcast documentary, also hosted by Zemiro, titled The Heart of Eurovision. On 24 March 2014, the Danish host broadcaster DR gave SBS permission to perform as an interval act in the second semi-final of the  contest. One day later, on 25 March, Jessica Mauboy was internally selected to perform. On 8 May 2014, Mauboy sang her song "Sea of Flags".

2015–present: Participation
Special Broadcasting Service (SBS) made the country's debut at the 2015 contest with the song "Tonight Again", performed by Guy Sebastian. Although Australia is outside the European Broadcasting Area, the EBU and Austrian host broadcaster ORF decided to permit an Australian entry to commemorate the 60th contest. The special circumstances surrounding Australia's entry and "to not reduce the chances" of the semi-final participants led the organisers to allow Australia to compete directly in the final, without going through a semi-final. In the event that Australia should win the contest, the EBU had confirmed that in accordance with the rules, Australia would not host the event in the Southern Hemisphere, and instead would co-host the contest within a country in the EBU. Further to the EBU's statement, it was confirmed that 's participating broadcaster Norddeutscher Rundfunk (NDR) would be the first choice, and the 's broadcaster British Broadcasting Corporation (BBC) would be the back-up should Germany decline.

Although Australia's participation in 2015 was announced as a one-off event, it was confirmed on 17 November 2015 that Australia would participate in the 2016 contest. Unlike in 2015, Australia did not receive automatic qualification. On 7 October 2015, it was announced that Australia would make its debut in the Junior Eurovision Song Contest 2015 after SBS was invited to perform in the contest. The Australian entry for the 2016 contest was Dami Im with her song "Sound of Silence", which won the second semi-final before finishing second overall behind Ukraine.

Australia continued its participation at the 2017 contest following their success the previous year. On 7 March 2017, at the Paris Cat Jazz Club in Melbourne, SBS announced former X Factor Australia winner Isaiah Firebrace as Australia's entry. With the song "Don't Come Easy", Isaiah participated in the first semi-final on 9 May, then qualified for the final on 13 May in which Australia placed 9th.

Australia competed in the 2018 contest, selecting Jessica Mauboy as the artist to represent the country with "We Got Love". Although this continued Australia's track record of perfect attendance in the final (a record it shared with Ukraine until their first ever non-qualification in 2021), it was the first instance of them not finishing in the top ten, ending in 20th place with 99 points, only nine of which came from the televote, the first time that Australia finished last in the televote.

In 2019, it was announced that for the first time, Australian viewers would be given the opportunity to choose their Eurovision representative. The Eurovision - Australia Decides national final took place on 9 February 2019, with a 50/50 say between an Australian jury and a televote to determine who would represent the country at the 2019 contest. Eurovision – Australia Decides was hosted in Gold Coast, Queensland by Myf Warhurst and Joel Creasey. The winner was Kate Miller-Heidke with the song "Zero Gravity". Runners-up Electric Fields were selected as the Australian jury spokespersons. At the contest in Tel Aviv, Israel, Australia went on to finish 9th in the final, after winning the first semi-final.

SBS announced it would host Eurovision – Australia Decides – Gold Coast 2020 to choose their representative for the 2020 contest. The event was held on the Gold Coast from 7–8 February, and Montaigne with "Don't Break Me" emerged as the winner. Following the cancellation of the 2020 contest, SBS internally selected Montaigne to represent Australia in the 2021 contest, this time with "Technicolour". For the first time since its 2015 debut, Australia failed to qualify for the final, finishing 14th in the first semi-final with 28 points.

Eurovision – Australia Decides returned to select the Australian entry for the 2022 contest. The show took place on 26 February, and was won by Sheldon Riley with the song "Not the Same". At the contest in Turin, Italy, Australia went on to finish in 15th place in the final with 125 points, after finishing in second place in the second semi-final with 243 points.

For the 2023 contest, SBS internally selected Voyager, who had finished runner-up in Eurovision – Australia Decides the year prior, to represent the country with the song "Promise".

Australia's participation in the contest has been confirmed by the EBU and SBS until 2023.

Participation overview

Other awards

Marcel Bezençon Awards

Related involvement

Heads of delegation
The public broadcaster of each participating country in the Eurovision Song Contest assigns a head of delegation as the EBU's contact person and the leader of their delegation at the event. The delegation, whose size can greatly vary, includes a head of press, the contestants, songwriters, composers and backing vocalists, among others.

Jury members
A five-member jury panel consisting of music industry professionals is made up for every participating country for the semi-finals and final of the Eurovision Song Contest, ranking all entries except for their own country's contribution. The juries' votes add 50% to the overall result alongside televoting.

Commentators and spokespeople

Incidental participation
Although not actively participating at the Eurovision Song Contest prior to the 2014 semi-final interval presentation, Australia has appeared in the contest incidentally in a number of ways:

Peter Doyle and Marty Kristian, both Australians, represented the United Kingdom as part of the New Seekers, who performed "Beg, Steal or Borrow" at the 1972 contest in Edinburgh. The song, co-written by Australian Tony Cole, finished second with 114 points.
 English-born Australian singer-songwriter Olivia Newton-John represented the United Kingdom in 1974 (prior to Australian broadcast of the contest) in Brighton with the song "Long Live Love", finishing in fourth place with 14 points.
John Farrar, who was born in Melbourne, performed as part of the Shadows for the United Kingdom at the 1975 contest.
Martin Lee, singer in Brotherhood of Man, which won the 1976 contest, spent several years of his childhood in Australia.
Austria paid tribute to Australia in 1977 in London with their entry "Boom Boom Boomerang" performed by Schmetterlinge. The song was considered controversial at the time due to being the first song to openly mock the contest itself.
Johnny Logan, winner of the contest in 1980 and 1987 for Ireland (and writer of the winning song for Ireland at the 1992 contest), was born in Frankston, Victoria in 1954, but moved with his family back to Ireland in 1957.
 Australian singer Gina G represented the United Kingdom in the 1996 contest in Oslo with her song "Ooh Aah... Just a Little Bit".
Jane Comerford, who was born in Newcastle, New South Wales, performed in the 2006 contest for Germany as a part of Texas Lightning with the song "No No Never", which finished in 14th place with 36 points.
Australians Craig Porteils and Cameron Giles-Webb co-wrote the song "This Is Our Night" which was performed by Sakis Rouvas for Greece at the 2009 contest.
Katrina Noorbergen (member of Cassette Kids) , an Australian living in Berlin, co-wrote the song "A Million Voices" which was performed by Polina Gagarina for Russia at the 2015 contest. She also performed as one of Gagarina's backing singers in the contest.
Tonino Speciale, who grew up in Western Sydney, co-wrote the song "Black Smoke" which was performed by Ann Sophie for Germany at the 2015 contest.
Mary-Jean O'Doherty, an American-born and half-Australian opera singer, performed as part of the group Genealogy for Armenia at the 2015 contest.
Anja Nissen, who is from the Blue Mountains of New South Wales but is the child of Danish parents, represented Denmark at the 2017 contest in Kyiv, finishing in 20th place with 77 points. The song, "Where I Am", was co-written by Australian songwriters Angel Tupai and Michael D'Arcy.
Australian singer-songwriter and Eurovision – Australia Decides 2019 competitor Alfie Arcuri co-wrote 's entry for the  contest "Running" which was to be performed by Sandro. The contest was later cancelled due to the COVID-19 pandemic.
Marius Bear, who is half-Australian, having spent several years in Australia and is the holder of an Australian passport, represented Switzerland at the  contest in Turin, finishing in 17th place with 78 points.

Photo gallery

See also
Australia in the Junior Eurovision Song Contest
Australia in the ABU Radio Song Festival
Australia in the ABU TV Song Festival

Notes and references

Notes

References

External links
 
 

 
Countries in the Eurovision Song Contest
Australian music